The BLS Playoff MVP, or Serbian League Playoff MVP, is the award bestowed to the player that is deemed to be the "Most Valuable Player" during the playoff of the Basketball League of Serbia. The Basketball League of Serbia is the top-tier level national men's professional club basketball league in Serbia. The award has existed and been awarded by the Serbian League since the 2006–07 season.

Winners

See also
ABA League Finals MVP

References

External links
 Official website
 Basketball League of Serbia at eurobasket.com

European basketball awards
MVP
Basketball most valuable player awards